The Rivière du Lorrain is a river of Martinique. It flows into the Caribbean Sea near Le Lorrain. The river valley of Lorrain is a popular site for hiking and picnics.

See also
List of rivers of Martinique

References

Rivers of Martinique
Rivers of France